Gone Fishing or Gone Fishin' may refer to:

Film and TV
 Gone Fishin''' (film)]], a 1997 American comedy
 Gone Fishing (2008 film), a short film by Chris Jones
 Gone Fishing (2012 film), an Argentine film
 "Gone Fishing!", an episode of Barney & Friends "Gone Fishin, an episode of Alvin and the Chipmunks
 Mortimer & Whitehouse: Gone Fishing, a BBC television series starring Bob Mortimer and Paul Whitehouse

Other
 [[Gone Fishin' (video game)|Gone Fishin (video game)]], a 1994 computer game
 Gone Fishin''', a 1997 Easy Rawlins mystery novel by Walter Mosley
 Gone Fishin', a music duo consisting of Tim Lee and Matt Piucci, who recorded the 1986 album Can't Get Lost When You're Goin' NowhereAlbums
 [[Gone Fishin' (Flipper album)|Gone Fishin (Flipper album), 1984
 Gone Fishing (album), a 2009 mixtape by The Cool Kids

Songs
 "Gone Fishin (song), a 1951 song written by Nick and Charles Kenny, popularized by Louis Armstrong and Bing Crosby
 "Gone Fishing" (Second Person song), a 2007 song by Second Person
 "Gone Fishing", a 1991 song by Chris Rea from Auberge
 "Gone Fishing", a 2015 song by Róisín Murphy from Hairless Toys
 "Gone Fishing", a Thomas & Friends song